Operation Legacy was a British Colonial Office (later Foreign Office) programme to destroy or hide files, to prevent them being inherited by its ex-colonies. It ran from the 1950s until the 1970s, when the decolonisation of the British Empire was at its height.

Methods of operation
MI5 or Special Branch agents vetted all secret documents in the colonial administrations to find those that could embarrass the British government—for instance by showing racial or religious bias. They identified 8,800 files to conceal from at least 23 countries and territories in the 1950s and 1960s, and destroyed them or sent them to the United Kingdom. Precise instructions were given for methods to be used for destruction, including burning and dumping at sea. Some of the files detailed torture methods used against opponents of the colonial administrations, such as during the Mau Mau Uprising.

As decolonisation progressed, British officials were keen to avoid a repeat of the embarrassment that had been caused by the overt burning of documents that took place in New Delhi in 1947, which had been covered by Indian news sources. On 3 May 1961, Iain Macleod, who was Secretary of State for the Colonies, wrote a telegram to all British embassies to advise them on the best way to retrieve and dispose of sensitive documents. To prevent post-colonial governments from ever learning about Operation Legacy, officials were required to dispatch "destruction certificates" to London. In some cases, as the handover date approached, the immolation task proved so huge that colonial administrators warned the Foreign Office that there was a danger of "celebrating Independence Day with smoke."

Research
Academic study of the end of the British Empire has been assisted in recent years by the declassification of the migrated archives in the Foreign and Commonwealth Office (FCO) 141 series. After the UK government admitted in 2011 that it had secret documents related to the Mau Mau Uprising, it began to declassify documents and by November 2013 some 20,000 files had been declassified. These documents can now be accessed at the National Archives in Kew, London.

References

External links

Foreign and Commonwealth Office migrated archives

Decolonization
Foreign, Commonwealth and Development Office
History of the British Empire
Information operations and warfare
MI5
Government documents of the United Kingdom
Secret government programs
United Kingdom government information
Cover-ups